The  is a Japanese Shinto shrine on the shores of Lake Ashi in the town of Hakone in the Ashigarashimo District of Kanagawa Prefecture.

Enshrined kami
The primary kami of Hakone Shrine are 
 
 
 

History
According to shrine tradition, Hakone-jinja was founded in 757 during the reign of Emperor Kōshō.  The original shrine was at the summit of the Komagatake peak of Mount Hakone.

The shrine was relocated to the shores of Lake Ashi; its current form dates to 1667. Credit for establishment is also given to Priest Mangan, for pacifying the nine-headed dragon that lived at the bottom of Lake Ashi. According to the Azuma Kagami, Minamoto no Yoritomo sought guidance and shelter from the kami at Hakone after his defeat in Battle of Ishibashiyama during the Genpei War. Upon becoming shōgun, Yoritomo became a patron of the shrine.

In the Kamakura period, the shrine was popular with samurai. This support continued through the Sengoku period.

The shrine was burned down by the forces of Toyotomi Hideyoshi during the Battle of Odawara. It was reconstructed by Tokugawa Ieyasu and given a grant of 200 koku of revenue.  The Tokugawa shogunate continued to support the shrine.

Cultural artifacts
Hakone Shrine has a small museum, which displays a number of the shrine's treasures. These include five items which are ranked as national Important Cultural Property.

Events
The main festival of the shrine is held annually on August 1.

See also
 List of Shinto shrines in Japan
 Modern system of ranked Shinto shrines

References

External links 

 箱根神社 (Hakone jinja) website
 "Hakone Jinja Shrine" at Asahi-net.or.jp
 (Lake Ashi) website

Beppyo shrines
Shinto shrines in Kanagawa Prefecture
Buildings and structures in Hakone, Kanagawa
Mountain faith